Katunguru, also Katungulu is an administrative ward  in Sengerema District, Mwanza Region, Tanzania. In 2016 the Tanzania National Bureau of Statistics report there were 22,848 people in the ward, from 20,284 in 2012.

Villages 
The ward has 24 villages.

 Magharibi
 Uswahilini
 Mashariki
 Mwambao
 Bubinza
 Igalagalilo Mashariki
 Igalagalilo Magharibu
 Nyankolongo
 Nyamtelela Kati
 Kabingo
 Isamilo
 Ikolo
 Isakulilo
 Mabatini
 Nkungule "A"
 Nkungule "B"
 Bugando
 Mtakuja
 Nyashimba
 Madukani
 Mwambao
 Sokoni
 Nyamlege
 Mlimani

References

Sengerema District
Wards of Mwanza Region